Brant South was a federal and provincial electoral district in Ontario, Canada, that was represented in the House of Commons of Canada from 1867 to 1904, and in the Legislative Assembly of Ontario from 1867 to 1923.

It was also called the South Riding of Brant. Brant County was named after Joseph Brant, a Mohawk Chief originally from New York State who settled the area, centred on Brantford.

Federal electoral district 
The federal riding was created by the British North America Act of 1867, which divided the county of Brant into two ridings: Brant North and Brant South according to a traditional division. In 1882, the South Riding of Brant was defined to consist of the townships of West Brantford, Onondaga and Tuscarora, the city of Brantford and the town of Paris.

The electoral district was abolished in 1903 when it was merged into Brantford riding.

The first Member of Parliament for Brant South, elected in 1867 was Edmund Burke Wood. Wood was also elected to the Provincial Parliament. Eventually an act was passed to abolish dual representation.

In 1872, the Liberal candidate, William Paterson (a biscuit manufacturer) won the riding, and remained Member of Parliament until 1896, when he was defeated by Robert Henry (a grocer, and Conservative).

This election was declared void, and in a by-election Charles Bernhard Heyd (a Liberal, and also a grocer) won the riding. Heyd held the riding until it was abolished in 1903.

Provincial electoral district 
The provincial riding was also created in 1867.

The first Member of the Legislative Assembly for Brant South was Edmund Burke Wood. Wood was also elected to the first federal parliament. When an act was passed to abolish dual representation, Wood choose to remain in the provincial parliament.

In 1871, Arthur Sturgis Hardy won the riding. He held it until his death in 1889. Thomas H. Preston held the riding from 1899 until 1908. Willoughby Staples Brewster held the riding from 1908 until 1914. Joseph Henry Ham held the riding from 1914 until 1919. Morrison Mann MacBride held the riding from 1919 until 1923, when the provincial riding became the Brantford riding in 1923.

Federal election results

On Mr. Henry's election being declared void and on his being unseated, 15 December 1896:

|}

|}

See also 
 List of Canadian federal electoral districts
 Past Canadian electoral districts
 Brant County
 Joseph Brant

References

External links 
Riding history from the Library of Parliament

Former federal electoral districts of Ontario